Spaceflight as a practical endeavor began during World War II with the development of operational liquid-fueled rockets. Beginning life as a weapon, the V-2 was pressed into peaceful service after the war at the United States' White Sands Missile Range as well as the Soviet Union's Kapustin Yar. This led to a flourishing of missile designs setting the stage for the exploration of space. The small American WAC Corporal rocket was evolved into the Aerobee, a much more powerful sounding rocket. Exploration of space began in earnest in 1947 with the flight of the first Aerobee, 46 of which had flown by the end of 1950. These and other rockets, both Soviet and American, returned the first direct data on air density, temperature, charged particles and magnetic fields in the Earth's upper atmosphere.

The first Viking to accomplish this feat, number four, did so 10 May 1950. The Soviet Union developed a virtual copy of the V-2 called the R-1, which first flew in 1948. Its longer-ranged successor, the R-2, entered military service in 1950. This event marked the entry of both superpowers into the post-V-2 rocketry era.

Origins and rocket development

The era of spaceflight began in 1942 with the development of the V-2 rocket (A-4) as a ballistic missile by Germany, the first vehicle capable of reaching the  boundary of space (as defined by the World Air Sports Federation).

The post-war years saw rapid development in rocket technology by both superpowers, jumpstarted by the dozens of V-2s and hundreds of German specialists that ended up in the custody of the Soviet Union and the United States. The V-2, designed for carrying a warhead horizontally rather than vertical science missions, made an inefficient sounding rocket, while the wartime American WAC Corporal sounding rocket was too small to carry much scientific equipment. In 1946, the US Navy began development of its own heavy sounding rocket, the Viking, derived in part from the V-2. The Aerobee was developed from the WAC Corporal to loft lighter payloads.

The Soviet Union began military development of the R-1, a copy of the V-2 with modifications intended to improve reliability, in 1947. Flight testing of this first Soviet-made liquid-fueled missile began on 13 September 1948, and the rocket entered military service in 1950. The draft plan for the  range R-3 was approved on 7 December 1949, though it was never developed, later designs proving more useful and achievable.

Space exploration

V-2, WAC Corporal, and R-1A

The V-2s captured from Germany at the end of World War II were used for engineering and scientific missions by the United States and the Soviet Union. The first 25 captured V-2s were launched in the 15 months commencing 15 March 1946. By the end of 1950, more than 60 had been launched by the Americans, most of them equipped with research instruments. The first biological payloads launched to high altitude were sent on V-2s, starting with seeds and fruit flies in 1947, followed by mice and monkeys from 1948 onward.

The V-2 was also used in early experiments with two-stage rockets: Project Bumper combined the V-2 first stage with the WAC Corporal as second stage. Around 10 WAC Corporals were also launched on their own in this period.

The Soviet Union launched 11 captured V-2s in 1947. Three of the V-2s launched by the USSR in 1947 carried  experiment packages for measuring cosmic rays at high altitude; at least one returned usable data. Two Soviet R-1As (an experimental R-1 variant that tested nose cone separation at altitude) also carried scientific equipment during test launches in 1949, but neither returned usable data.

Aerobee

First launched on 24 November 1947, the solid/liquid-fuel hybrid Aerobee quickly secured a reputation for reliability. With the development of these first generation purpose-built sounding rockets, the exploration of Earth's upper atmosphere and the nearest reaches of space began in earnest, a total of 46 Aerobee flights being launched through 1950. Aerobee flights measured the velocity and density of cosmic rays above  and made high altitude measurements of the Earth's magnetic field. Cameras mounted on Aerobee rockets returned the first high quality aerial photographs of sizeable regions of the Earth as well as large scale cloud formations.

Viking

Vikings 1 and 2, launched in 1949 from White Sands Missile Range in New Mexico, both suffered from premature engine cutoff due to turbine leaks, significantly reducing their maximum altitude. The improved Viking 3, launched 9 February 1950 reached  and could have gone higher. However, after 34 seconds of accurately guided flight, the rocket veered westward and had to be destroyed by range safety.

On 10 May 1950, Viking 4 was launched from a site in the Pacific Ocean between Jarvis Island and Christmas Island. This flight was perfect, reaching , more than double that reached by the earlier Vikings.

Viking 5, launched 21 November 1950, carried a vast array of radiation detectors.

Launches

1942

|}

1943

|}

1944

|}

1945

|}

1946

|}

1947

|}

1948

|}

1949

|}

1950

|}

Suborbital launch summary (1945–1950)

By country

By rocket

See also
 Timeline of spaceflight
 List of V-2 test launches

References

Footnotes

Spaceflight before 1951
1944 in science
1946 in science
1947 in science
1948 in science
1949 in science
1950 in science
1950